Filthy Forty is a gasser of the 1960s. 

Filthy Forty is a Chevrolet-powered 1940 Willys entered by the team of Hill & Zartman.

Notes

Sources
 Davis, Larry. Gasser Wars, North Branch, MN: Cartech, 2003, pp. 180–188.

1940s cars
1960s cars
Drag racing cars
Rear-wheel-drive vehicles
Willys vehicles